Thermomesochra reducta is a species of copepod in the family Canthocamptidae, and the only species in the genus Thermomesochra. It is listed as Data Deficient on the IUCN Red List.

References

Harpacticoida
Endemic fauna of Selangor
Freshwater crustaceans of Asia
Thermophiles
Invertebrates of Malaysia
Monotypic arthropod genera
Taxonomy articles created by Polbot